The Roman Catholic Diocese of kadapa is a diocese located in the city of Kadapa in the Ecclesiastical province of Hyderabad in India.

Presently, there are about 66 parishes catering to 81,580 Catholics in the diocese. Planning of New Diocese in Kuppam (Chittoor district) for Chittoor District and neighbour people. This New Diocese of Kuppam will be helpful and be connected to Dharmapuri and Kadapa Dioceses.

Diocese of KUPPAM : 

Our Lady Of Health Catholic Church
(Arogya Matha Catholic Church)-1976, 
Arogya  Matha  Road,
Kuppam - 517425,
Chittoor District,
Andhra Pradesh.

History
 19 October 1976: Established as the Diocese of kadapa from the Diocese of Nellore

Leadership
 Bishops of kadapa (Latin Rite)
 Bishop Gallela Prasad (31 January 2008 – 10 December 2018)
 Bishop Doraboina Moses Prakasam (26 July 2002 – 7 December 2006)
 Bishop Prakash Mallavarapup (22 May 1998 – 26 July 2002)
 Bishop Abraham Aruliah Somavarapa (28 October 1976 – 24 January 1998)

Notes
 Chittoor District will have a New Diocese in Kuppam Soon. Kuppam Diocese will be connected and serve to Dharmapuri and Kadapa Dioceses.

External links
 GCatholic.org 
 Catholic Hierarchy 

Roman Catholic dioceses in India
Christian organizations established in 1976
Roman Catholic dioceses and prelatures established in the 20th century
1976 establishments in Andhra Pradesh
Christianity in Andhra Pradesh
Kadapa